Pavel Olegovich Kazantsev (born 22 March 1960) is a Kazakh politician currently serving as the Deputy Chair of the Mazhilis since 15 January 2021 and as Mazhilis member since 2016.

Biography

Early life and education 
Kazantsev was born in 1960 in the city of Tomsk in present-day Russia. In 1982, he graduated with honors from the Tselinograd Civil Engineering Institute, specializing in automobiles and auto industry. Then in 1986, from the Dzerzhinsky Higher School of the KGB.

Career 
Kazantsev began his career in 1982 as a senior engineer, head of a technical and technical department, a senior engineer for safety and labor protection, a foreman of ATP-3 of the cargo auto department of the Tselinograd Region under the Kazakh SSR Ministry of Transport. From 1986, he served in KGB Directorate in the region.

From 1992, Kazantsev worked in the head of department, chairman of the Committee for Foreign Economic Relations, representative of the Ministry of Foreign Economic Relations in the administration of the Akmola Region. In 1995, he was appointed as deputy äkim of Akmola and from 1997, Kazantsev served as an advisor to the deputy chairman of the Administrative Council of the FEZ. From 1998, he worked as a deputy director of the Fund for Economic and Social Development of FEZ, deputy chairman of the board and head of the Investment Department of the Akmola Fund.

In 1999, Kazantsev was appointed as a director of the consulting company Center for Business Initiatives. While working in the post, he served as a member of the Astana City Mäslihat from 2003 and a representative of the CISCO company in Astana from 2005 until 2007, when he became Deputy and First Deputy Chairman of the Nur Otan Astana City Branch. In 2010, he was appointed as director of the Department of Political Work, Department of Organizational and Political Work of the Central Office of the Nur Otan where he worked until 2013. From 2014 to 2015, Kazantsev briefly served as the development manager, head of the planning service for programs, events, external relations and communications of the Foundation of the First President of the Republic of Kazakhstan – Leader of the Nation, then from 2015 to 2016 as the Deputy Chairman – Director of the Department of Organizational Personnel Work and Assets of the Federation of Trade Unions of Kazakhstan.

Member of the Mazhilis (2016–present) 
In the aftermath of 2016 Kazakh legislative election, Kazantsev was elected as a member of the Mazhilis. From there, he served as a member of the Committee on Economic Reform and Regional Development of the Mazhilis. Following his reelection in 2021, Kazantsev, along with Balaim Kesebaeva, became the Deputy Chair of the Mazhilis.

Personal life 
Kazantsev is married and has two children. He serves as president and vice president of several associations in Kazakhstan. Since 2018, Kazantsev has been the chairman of Tourism Industry Committee of the Presidium of the Atameken National Chamber of Entrepreneurs of the Republic of Kazakhstan and Nur Otan Party Control Committee.

References 

Living people
People from Tomsk
Kazakhstani people of Russian descent
Nur Otan politicians
Members of the Mazhilis
1960 births